Adil Ramzi (born 14 July 1977) is a Moroccan-Dutch professional football coach and a former midfielder. He is the head coach of Eerste Divisie club Jong PSV.

International career
Ramzi was a member of the Morocco national team playing 34 international matches and scoring four goals. He also played in the 1997 FIFA World Youth Championship. Ramzi represented his country at many African championships.

Coaching career
In December 2019, after four years of working with the youth setup, Ramzi was moved to the first team coaching staff of PSV

Notes

1977 births
Living people
Moroccan footballers
Association football forwards
Sportspeople from Marrakesh
Morocco international footballers
Morocco under-20 international footballers
2000 African Cup of Nations players
2002 African Cup of Nations players
Eredivisie players
Segunda División players
Qatar Stars League players
Kawkab Marrakech players
Udinese Calcio players
Willem II (football club) players
PSV Eindhoven players
Córdoba CF players
FC Twente players
AZ Alkmaar players
FC Utrecht players
Roda JC Kerkrade players
Al-Wakrah SC players
Umm Salal SC players
Moroccan expatriate footballers
Moroccan expatriate sportspeople in the Netherlands
Moroccan expatriate football managers
Expatriate footballers in the Netherlands
PSV Eindhoven non-playing staff
Moroccan football managers
Eerste Divisie managers